StarMade is an effectively infinite open-universe space simulation sandbox game in development by Schine for Windows, macOS, and Linux. StarMade is currently in alpha and is free to play, during alpha.

Gameplay 

In StarMade, the player, an astronaut, explores the generated voxel universe. This universe contains randomly generated galaxies, stars, asteroids, artificial structures (such as space stations and shops), and planets. Players create and customize their own spacecraft to explore the universe. Players create ships with special blocks, where they can then proceed to customize their ship in the game's "Ship Build Mode". Ships can be customized with a variety of materials to enhance performance, add new features or create combat/defense systems. In single-player universes, there is the ability to access a "Creative Mode", as in Minecraft, where the player has access to every block and item in the game.

Crafting is present in the game, and is known as "Manufacturing". Players can craft parts with blocks called "Factories". Each factory has its own inventory and specific list of items that only those blocks can manufacture. Factories require power in order to manufacture other parts. Once a factory has been powered, players can put the ingredients in the right factory block, and it will start producing whatever it is programmed to produce. Players can gather natural resources (such as ore, stone, etc.) or salvage ships and space stations found throughout the universe in order to craft certain parts and items using the manufacturing feature.

The game has a weight-based inventory system and players are limited to the amount of items they can carry. Upon dying, the player will lose a portion of their credits as long as spawn protection isn't active, and players respawn at their current spawn point, which is set using a special block in-game. Unlike other survival games however, the player does not lose their inventory upon dying. Players can take damage from several factors, including ship weapons, personal weapons, and the environment.

Starmade has a "Factions" system, where groups of NPCs or players can interact. Some NPC factions are present in the base game, and users can interact with them. The most commonly encountered NPC factions are traders and pirates. Traders primarily re-stock in-game shops, and pirates attack all other factions on sight. Player created factions are available in both single-player and multiplayer. There is a faction diplomacy system, where faction owners can engage in negotiations and communications with each other. Player controlled factions frequently interact with each other on multiplayer servers within Starmade in various player versus player scenarios.

Multiplayer in StarMade is available through player-hosted servers and lets multiple players to interact and communicate with each other in a single universe. Players can also run their own servers on a personal computer. StarMade multiplayer servers are controlled by server admins, who have access to server commands, such as spawning items, or warping to players and ships. Server admins can also set up restrictions concerning which usernames or IP addresses – using a whitelist – are allowed to enter the server. Multiplayer servers offer players a wide range of activities, such as role-playing, enjoying player-created mini-games, collaborating with others, and waging faction warfare.

Development 
Robin Promesberger announced he had begun development of StarMade around 2010, describing it as a "Minecraft inspired 3D sandbox space shooter." The game was primarily inspired by the feel of Minecraft and various space themed TV shows. Promesberger had been developing the engine behind StarMade for almost a decade. In mid 2012, Kevin "Beetlebear" Collins joined StarMade and helped redesign the textures of the game, until he later decided to leave development on September 15, 2013, due to a disagreement in his share of the game's revenue with Promesberger. On November 2, 2013, it was announced that Keaton Pursell would be working on 3D Models for the game.

On July 24, 2013, StarMade was greenlit by the Steam community, meaning the game would eventually be added to the Steam store. It was officially made available on Steam on December 4, 2014. StarMade actively received updates on Steam every few months, until January 2020, when there was a nearly 2-year hiatus in development. In October 2021, a minor update was pushed by Promesberger, where he explained that the hiatus was due to needing to work on other projects mainly for monetary reasons. The source was made available to the community, and a team consisting of volunteer community members has been actively pushing updates to the game ever since.

See also 
 List of space flight simulation games
 Lightweight Java Game Library, a Java library used by StarMade.

References

External links 
 
 StarMade Forums
 Official Wiki

2014 video games
Open-world video games
Space flight simulator games
Indie video games
Linux games
MacOS games
Video games developed in Germany
Video games using procedural generation
Windows games
Multiplayer and single-player video games
First-person shooters
Science fiction video games